The International Journal of Biomathematics is a quarterly mathematics journal covering research in the area of biomathematics, including mathematical ecology, infectious disease dynamical system, biostatistics and bioinformatics. It was established in 2008 and is published by World Scientific. The current editor-in-chief is Lansun Chen (Anshan Normal University).

References

External links 
 

Mathematics journals
World Scientific academic journals
Quarterly journals
English-language journals
Publications established in 2008
Biology journals